The 1998 United States House of Representatives elections in Kansas were held on November 3, 1998, to elect the four U.S. representatives from the state of Kansas, one from each of the state's four congressional districts. Primaries were held on August 4, 1998.

Overview

District 1

District 2

District 3

District 4

References 

1998 Kansas elections
Kansas
1998